Kulbir Singh Bhaura (born 15 October 1955) is a British former field hockey player.

He was a member of the gold winning Great Britain squad at the 1988 Summer Olympics in Seoul. Four years earlier, at the 1984 Summer Olympics in Los Angeles, he secured the bronze medal with his team. Bhaura was also a member of the Silver medal-winning team in 1986 World cup in London and 1987 European Cup in Moscow. He played at international level for nine years for England and Great Britain. 
 A proud moment was when he was selected to represent World XI to play against Australia in 1987.

Bhaura was born in Jullundur, East Punjab, India into a Sikh family and came to England around the mid 1960s. After winning gold in 1988, he started working within the hockey industry, in marketing and developing equipment. He has visited hockey factories in India and Pakistan, developing hockey and cricket equipment under the brand name Pantheon. He was also involved in developing goalkeeping equipment and owned a ball manufacturing plant, "Chingford Balls". Bhaura owned THE PRO SHOP, specialising in hockey equipment and team-wear, based in Brentford (W London) and Hitchin (Hertfordshire). He was a European Distributor of the Gryphon Hockey brand since 1996. After Selling the Retail, Wholesale and Manufacturing operations in 2019, he now enjoys his retirement. 

Bhaura is a prominent member of the Indian Gymkhana club based in Osterley in W London and continues to play and coach hockey there to this day.

References

External links
 
 

1955 births
Living people
Field hockey players from Jalandhar
British male field hockey players
Olympic field hockey players of Great Britain
Field hockey players at the 1984 Summer Olympics
Field hockey players at the 1988 Summer Olympics
Olympic bronze medallists for Great Britain
Olympic gold medallists for Great Britain
Punjabi people
Indian emigrants to England
English people of Indian descent
English people of Punjabi descent
English Sikhs
British sportspeople of Indian descent
Olympic medalists in field hockey
Medalists at the 1988 Summer Olympics
Medalists at the 1984 Summer Olympics